"Push It" is a song by American hip hop group Salt-N-Pepa. It was released as the B-side of the "Tramp" single in 1987. It peaked at number 19 on the US Billboard Hot 100 in early 1988 and, after initially peaking at number 41 in the UK, it re-entered the charts after the group performed the track at Nelson Mandela's 70th birthday concert, eventually peaking at number two in the UK in July 1988. The song has also been certified platinum by the Recording Industry Association of America (RIAA). The song is ranked number 446 on Rolling Stones list of the 500 Greatest Songs of All Time and was ranked number nine on VH1's 100 Greatest Songs of Hip Hop.

History
The original version of "Push It" was first released as the B-side to the 12" single "Tramp" in 1987. The corresponding 7" single contained a "Mixx-It" remix by San Francisco DJ and producer Cameron Paul; this was the radio version that gave the group its first mainstream hit. It advanced into the US Billboard Top 40 the week of December 26, 1987, eventually reaching its peak of number 19 the week of February 20, 1988. "Push It" and "Let's Talk About Sex" tie as the group's highest-charting UK hit, both peaking at number two in that country.

The original 1986 editions of the album Hot, Cool & Vicious did not contain "Push It". When the Cameron Paul remix of "Push It" became a radio hit, the album was reissued with the "Push It" remix added, along with the original versions of "Tramp" and "Chick on the Side" replaced by remixes.

At a 1986 concert, police thought Salt-N-Pepa were singing "pussy real good" instead of "push it real good" and waited for them after the show to arrest them. They showed the police the written lyrics to prove them wrong.

Lyrics
The song quotes a line from  "You Really Got Me" by The Kinks, with the word "girl" replaced with "boy": "Boy, you really got me goin'/You got me so I don't know what I'm doin'." (For this, Ray Davies received a songwriting credit for "Push It.") It also quotes "Pick up on this" from "I'm a Greedy Man" and "There it is" from "There It Is", both by James Brown. The whispered "Push it" is sampled from a 1977 recording called "Keep on Pushin'" by the band Coal Kitchen. This song is written in the key of A minor.

Recognition and sales
"Push It" was nominated for a Grammy Award, and the strength of that single catapulted the reissued Hot, Cool and Vicious album to platinum sales in the US with one million sold, making Salt-N-Pepa the first female rap act (group or solo) to go gold or platinum. The album ultimately sold 1.3 million copies worldwide.

Critical reception
Debbi Voller from Number One stated, "Bound to be a big hit in the present hip hop/house/rap mania climate, and why not? 'Push It' pumps and grinds like a street version of James Brown's classic 'Sex Machine' and these gals can rap a mean, errr, rap!" Robin Smith from Record Mirror named "Push It" Single of the Week, writing, "Salt-n-Pepa produce enough energy to put life into a stuffed chimpanzee. 'Push It' is as sharp as a broken bottle on a mean city street, with forceful rhymes and heavyweight rhythms that just won't let up. If I was LL Cool J I'd put my gold chains in a safe and hide in a cupboard at home."

Music video
The accompanying music video for "Push It" features a concert performance of the song, along with  DJ Spinderella and Hurby "Luv Bug" Azor on keyboards and backing vocals. The group wears eight-ball jackets during the video.

Charts

Weekly charts

Year-end charts

Certifications

Usage in media
In 2006, the song is sung by actress Linda Cardellini in an infamous karaoke scene from the movie Grandma's Boy.

In 2009, the song was covered on the musical television show Glee'''s first season episode "Showmance" sung by Rachel Berry (Lea Michele), Finn Hudson (Cory Monteith), Artie Abrams (Kevin McHale) and other glee club members.

In 2011, the song was featured in a season 4 episode of Chuck called Chuck Versus the Push Mix in a scene where the characters Lester Patel and Jeffrey Barnes portrayed by Vik Sahay and Scott Krinsky play the song while Ellie Bartowski portrayed by Sarah Lancaster, the sister of the title character is seen giving birth to her first child named Clara Woodcomb. Additionally, both of the characters wear the jackets of Salt-N-Pepa while singing.

In 2014, the song was featured in a commercial for the GEICO auto insurance company with a featured cameo appearance by Salt-N-Pepa themselves as part of the "It's What You Do" campaign.The Big Bang Theory used the song twice. In 2016, the song was featured in a season 9 episode called "The Positive Negative Reaction" in a scene where the characters Leonard Hofstadter and Raj Koothrappali portrayed by Johnny Galecki and Kunal Nayyar cover the song in a karaoke party. In 2018, the song was used in episode 4 of the series, "Deutschland 86" where a cook is listening to it on a Walkman while he grills food. 

In 2020, the song was featured as the theme song of the ABC U.S. revival of TV game show Supermarket Sweep hosted by actress and comedian Leslie Jones.

The song is used frequently in Brooklyn Nine-Nine''.

References

1987 singles
1987 songs
Dutch Top 40 number-one singles
London Records singles
Next Plateau Entertainment singles
Salt-N-Pepa songs
Songs about dancing
Songs written by Hurby Azor